Chatuchak is one of the 50 districts (khet) of Bangkok, Thailand. The district is bounded by seven other districts (from the north clockwise): Lak Si, Bang Khen, Lat Phrao, Huai Khwang, Din Daeng, Phaya Thai, and Bang Sue.

History
Chatuchak was originally part of Bang Khen district. It became a separate district in 1989. The name of the district came from its two major landmarks, Chatuchak Park and Chatuchak Weekend Market.

Government and infrastructure
The district is divided into five sub-districts (khwaeng).

The Department of National Parks, Wildlife and Plant Conservation, Royal Forest Department and Department of Fisheries with Criminal Court of Thailand as well as Department of Land Transport have their headquarters in the district. Central Juvenile and Family Court is located on Kamphaeng Phet Road near Bang Sue Grand Station. Klong Prem Central Prison, also known as "Lat Yao Prison", is in the district.

Markets
The best-known site in the district is the Chatuchak Weekend Market, the largest market in Thailand. Northwest of the weekend market is another market, Chatuchak Plaza, which sells clothes and many other products. Across Kamphang Phet Road is Or Tor Kor Market (ตลาด อ.ต.ก.) belonging to The Marketing Organization for Farmers (องค์การตลาดเพื่อการเกษตร), offering fresh agricultural products and food. Just north of the market along Kamphang Phet Road is an area selling plants and garden products.

Parks

Adjoining the Chatuchak Weekend Market to the north is the Chatuchak Park complex, covering 1.13 km2 of a former State Railway of Thailand golf course consisting of Chatuchak Park (สวนจตุจักร), Queen Sirikit Park (สวนสมเด็จพระนางเจ้าสิริกิติ์ฯ), and Wachirabenchathat Park (สวนวชิรเบญจทัศ).

Chatuchak Park (0.304 km2) is the first park in the complex. It opened in December 1980 and is on Phahonyothin Road next to the Mo Chit BTS Station. It is the most accessible park of the three. Also included in this park is the Train Museum.

Queen Sirikit Park (0.224 km2) is a botanical garden built to honor the queen's 60th birthday in 1992. It was formally opened in December 1996. Plants collected in the garden include hibiscus, plumeria, and palms. Within the park compound is the Children's Museum. The park is behind the Chatuchak Weekend Market parking lot.

The Wachirabenchathat Park (0.600 km2) is the biggest and newest park of the complex. It was called State Railway Public Park (สวนรถไฟ, Suan Rot Fai) but was renamed in July 2002 in honor of Prince Maha Vajiralongkorn's 50th birthday. It contains a butterfly park and the tallest fountain in Thailand.

Locations
Elephant Tower (ตึกช้าง) is one of the most distinctive buildings in Bangkok. Shaped like an elephant, it consists of three towers (A, B, and C) joined at the top. It includes condominiums and office space.

On Vibhavadhi Road opposite Kasetsart University is the Museum of Contemporary Art (MOCA). Thawan Duchanee (ถวัลย์ ดัชนี, also written Tawan Datchanee), one of the artists highlighted, is considered one of the most famous modern day artists of Thailand.

Central Plaza Lat Phrao is the biggest shopping center in the district, consisting of Central Department Store, Bangkok Convention Centre (first convention hall in Thailand), cinemas, and many retail shops. Other shopping centers in Chatuchak District include Major Cineplex Ratchayothin featuring a 14-screen multiplex cinema and Union Mall, an eight-storey shopping mall for youngsters. Mixt Chatuchak and JJ Mall are two shopping malls located in the area of Chatuchak Weekend Market. Opposite JJ Mall is Bangsue Junction, a shopping mall that is a center for home decorations and antiques.

Bangkok Mass Transit System (BTSC), the operator of the BTS Skytrain has its headquarters at the district on Phahonyothin Road opposite Chatuchak Park.

Channel 7 and Thai Rath with Matichon, three of Thailand's leading mass media, have their headquarters in this district.

Wat Samian Nari and Wat Thewasunthorn are the only two Thai temples in the district.

RS, Thailand's leading entertainment company is also headquartered in Chatuchak.

The renowned amusement park Dan Neramit (Magic Land) was here on Phahonyothin Road near Central Plaza Lat Phrao between 1976 and 2010, now it has become a go-kart racing track.

Education

Kasetsart University is one of the top universities in Thailand. Originally focused on agricultural sciences, it now includes many fields including business and engineering. The university is on a large block bounded by Vibhavadi Rangsit Road, Ngamwongwan Road and Phahonyothin Road.

Sripatum University is a private university adjacent to 11th Royal Infantry Regiment.

Saint John's University and Saint John's International School are also in Chatuchak District.

Chandrakasem Rajabhat University is a branch of Rajabhat University located on Ratchadaphisek Road near Criminal Court of Thailand.

Transport
The district is crossed by the Blue Line of the Bangkok MRT with four stations: Kamphaeng Phet, Chatuchak Park, Phahon Yothin, and Lat Phrao. Bang Sue MRT Station is on the borderline with Bang Sue District.

Chatuchak district is the northern end-point of the Sukhumvit Line of the BTS Skytrain at Ha Yaek Lat Phrao station. The Northern Bus Terminal (often called Mo Chit Mai or Mo Chit 2, หมอชิตใหม่ or หมอชิต 2) is in the district, with bus connections to northern provinces.

This district is served by the Bang Sue Junction railway station, Nikhom Rotfai KM.11 halt, and Bang Khen railway station of the State Railway of Thailand, whose Southern (only Bang Sue Junction railway station), Northern, and Northeastern Lines runs past the area.

Krung Thep Aphiwat Central Terminal replaced Bang Sue 1 railway station with the station fully completed on November 29, 2021. It is behind Chatuchak Weekend Market. It serves as Thailand's current railway hub as it replaced Bangkok railway station (Hua Lamphong).

Lat Phrao Intersection, also known as Lat Phrao Square is the main junction of both the district and Bangkok, it is the five corners of Phahonyothin, Vibhavadi Rangsit and Lat Phrao Roads with Don Mueang Tollway, regarded as the beginning of Lat Phrao Road.

District council
The district council for Chatuchak has eight members, who serve four-year terms. Elections were last held on 30 April 2006. The results were:
Thai Rak Thai Party, eight seats.

Economy

Thai Airways International and Bangkok Airways have their head offices in Chatuchak.

TMB Bank and Siam Commercial Bank (SCB) with Bank for Agriculture and Agricultural Co-operatives (BAAC) have their head offices in the district as well. The head office building of SCB is known as SCB Park Plaza.

Gallery

References

External links

Chatuchak district office (Thai only)

 
Districts of Bangkok